Turkish Australians or Australian Turks are Australians who have emigrated from Turkey or who have Turkish ancestral origins. 

Turks first began to immigrate to Australia from the island of Cyprus for work in the 1940s, and then again when Turkish Cypriots were forced to leave their homes during the Cyprus conflict between 1963 and 1974. Furthermore, many Turkish immigrants arrived in Australia after a bilateral agreement was signed between Turkey and Australia in 1967. Recently, smaller groups of Turks have begun to immigrate to Australia from Bulgaria, Greece, Iraq and the North Macedonia. There were also many Australians in Turkey during World War I (Gallipoli/ANZAC).

History

Ottoman migration
Earliest known short term Turkish migrants in Australia date back to 1860s to 1900 period when small groups of mainly Muslim cameleers were shipped in and out of Australia at three-year intervals, to service South Australia's inland pastoral industry by carting goods and transporting wool bales by camel trains, who were commonly referred to as "Afghans" or "Ghans", despite their origin often being mainly from British India, and some even from Afghanistan and Egypt and Turkey.

The presence of Turkish people in Australia dates back to the early 19th century, although at the time there were only about 20 Turkish settlers. Their number increased to 300 by the 1911 census. Their number declined during the First World War when Australia and Turkey fought on opposite sides.

Turkish Cypriot migration

A notable scale of Turkish Cypriot migration to Australia began in the late 1940s; they were the only Muslims acceptable under the White Australia Policy. Prior to 1940, the Australian Census recorded only three settlers from Cyprus that spoke Turkish as their primary language. A further 66 Turkish Cypriots arrived in Australia in the late 1940s, marking the beginning of a Turkish Cypriot immigration trend to Australia. By 1947-1956 there were 350 Turkish Cypriot settlers who were living in Australia.

Between 1955–1960, the island of Cyprus' independence was approaching; however, Turkish Cypriots felt vulnerable as they had cause for concern about the political future of the island when the Greek Cypriots attempted to overthrow the British government and unite Cyprus with Greece (known as "enosis"). After a failed attempt by the Greek Cypriots, the right-wing party, EOKA, reformed itself from 1963–1974 and launched a series of attacks in a bid to proclaim "enosis". These atrocities resulted in the exodus of Turkish Cypriots in fear for their lives, many migrating to Australia and Britain. Early Turkish Cypriot immigrants found jobs working in factories, out in the fields, or building national infrastructure. However, some Turkish Cypriots became entrepreneurs and established their own businesses once they had saved enough money.

Once the Greek military junta rose to power in 1967, they staged a coup d'état in 1974 against the Cypriot President, with the help of EOKA B, to unite the island of Cyprus with Greece. Thus, there was an exodus of more Turkish Cypriots to Australia due to fears that the island would unite with Greece. The Greek coup led to a military invasion by Turkey which divided the island. In 1983 the Turkish Cypriots declared their own state, the Turkish Republic of Northern Cyprus (TRNC), which has remained internationally unrecognised except by Turkey. The division has led to an economic embargo against the Turkish Cypriots by the United States and Greek Cypriot controlled Government of Cyprus, effectively depriving the Turkish Cypriots of foreign investment, aid and export markets. Thus, the Turkish Cypriot economy has remained stagnant and undeveloped; Turkish Cypriots have continued to leave the island in search of a better life in Britain, Australia, and Canada.

Mainland Turkish migration
On 5 October 1967, the governments of Australia and Turkey signed an agreement to allow Turkish citizens to immigrate to Australia. Prior to this recruitment agreement, there were
less than 3,000 people of Turkish origin in Australia. According to the Australian Bureau of Statistics, nearly 19,000 Turkish immigrants arrived from 1968–1974. The first Turkish immigrants were greeted at Sydney International Airport by Turkish Cypriots, whilst Turkish immigrants who moved to Melbourne were greeted at Essendon Airport by members of the Cyprus Turkish Association. They came largely from rural areas of Turkey; at the time, approximately 30% were skilled and 70% were unskilled workers. However, this changed in the 1980s when the number of skilled Turks applying to enter Australia had increased considerably. Over the next 35 years the Turkish population rose to almost 100,000. More than half of the Turkish community settled in Victoria, mostly in the north-western suburbs of Melbourne.

Migration from other countries
There are also ethnic Turks who have immigrated to Australia from Bulgaria, the Western Thrace area of northern Greece, the Republic of Macedonia, as well as Germany and other Western European countries.

Demographics

Population
Although the 2006 Australian Census shows 59,402 people in Australia who claimed to be of Turkish ancestry, this is not a true representation of the entire community. Indeed, as early as 1994, The Age estimated that the Turkish Australian population was 150,000. By 2013 Louise Asher, who was a member of the Victorian Legislative Assembly, said that the Turkish Australian community in Melbourne alone had numbered 300,000. More recently, the number of Turkish Australians who originate from Turkey reached 200,000 in 2017; meanwhile the Turkish Cypriot Australian community was estimated to number 120,000 in 2016.

Turkish Cypriot population

In 1993 a publication from the Council of Europe reported that 30,000 Turkish Cypriot immigrants were living in Australia. By 2001 the TRNC Ministry of Foreign Affairs claimed to represent 40,000 Turkish Cypriots (i.e. TRNC citizens only) living in Australia. More recently, in 2016, Dr Levent Vahdettin et al. said that the total Turkish Cypriot Australian community was 120,000 - including descendants.

Mainland Turkish population
In 1999, Rob White et al. said that there was 75,000 people who were Turkish-born or had a Turkish immigrant background in Australia. By 2011 Dr Liza Hopkins said that within 35 years, between 1967 and 2002, the Turkish-immigrant community and their descendants had risen to 100,000. More recently, the Turkish origin population in Australia (i.e. excluding Turkish Cypriots etc.) was 200,000 in 2017.

Other Turkish populations
There are smaller populations of Turkish ancestry who have immigrated to Australia from Bulgaria, the Western Thrace area of northern Greece, the Republic of Macedonia, as well as some who had migrated via Germany and other Western European countries.

Settlement
Turkish Australians mainly live in New South Wales and Victoria, especially in the cities of Melbourne and Sydney. In Melbourne they reside largely in the suburbs of Broadmeadows, Meadow Heights, Collingwood, Brunswick, Coburg, Fitzroy, Richmond, Springvale and Dandenong. In Sydney, they are concentrated in Auburn, Guildford, Botany, Fairfield, Marrickville, Blacktown, Liverpool, Prestons and Ashfield.

Culture
Community bonds remain strong in the Turkish Australian community. They are geographically concentrated in particular areas of Australia which has led to the maintenance of certain cultural traditions across generations. The Turkish language and a "moderate" Islam are symbolic markers of the Turkish Australian culture. More generally, notions of family loyalty, the social organisation of marriage and traditional segregation of gender roles have shaped the youths' identities in Australia.

Religion

Turkish Cypriots are considered to be the first immigrants in Australia who formed a large Muslim community, followed by immigrants from Turkey and then Lebanon. According to the 2006 Australian census, 18% of Australian Muslims are of Turkish origin. Turkish Australian Muslims practice a "moderate Islam" and are significantly secularised; Turkish Cypriots in particular are not so religious and are brought up as Kemalists and are strongly secular.

The Turkish Australian community favours religious sermons in the Turkish language (rather than in Arabic) and attends Friday prayers in Turkish mosques. There are numerous notable Turkish mosques in Australia; in 1992, the Cyprus Turkish Islamic Society constructed an Ottoman-style mosque, known as the Sunshine Mosque, which was designed to mirror the Sultan Ahmed Mosque in Istanbul. Another important Turkish mosque is the Auburn Gallipoli Mosque, which attracts about 800 worshippers every week and is listed as an Australian heritage building. Thomastown Mosque was built (early 1990s) by the Thomastown Turkish Islamic Society.

According to the 2016 Census, a majority (67.1%) of the Turkey-born population in Victoria was Muslim. Approximately 16.4% of the Turks were not religious, while the largest Christian denominations were the Oriental Orthodox Churches (2.4%), Eastern Orthodox Churches (2.0%), the Catholic Church (1.2%) and other churches (1.6%). The rest of the population belong to other religions or did not state their religious affiliation.

Language

The Turkish language is well maintained in Australia and is seen as very important for the self-identification of Turkish Australians. There are numerous Turkish private schools, including Ilim College, Irfan College, Sirius (previously known as Isik) College, Damla College and Burc College that cater for Turkish Australian students.

Media

Newspapers
There are several Turkish language newspapers produced in Australia and generally available free of charge, including Turkish News Press, Anadolu, Yeni Vatan, Dünya, Camia, Zaman, and the Australian Turkish News Weekly.

Radio
The Australian Voice of Turkey currently broadcasts 7 days a week through the digital station 2TripleO which is based in Burwood in Sydney. Also, in Sydney and Melbourne SBS Radio broadcasts in the Turkish language for an hour a day. Other community stations also broadcast in Turkish, though with less hours of content. For example, 3ZZZ currently produces five hours of Turkish programming spread over four days each week.

Television
Turkish satellite television services are available in Australia. The Australian satellite service provider UBI World TV claims to reach 40,000 Turkish speakers. Furthermore, BRT, the official radio and television broadcasting corporation of Northern Cyprus, claims to reach 60,000 Turkish Cypriot Australians.

Notable people

See also

 Australians in Turkey
 Association of Turkish Cypriots Abroad
 Albion Rovers FC (Cairnlea), football club established by the Turkish Cypriot community 
 Hume City FC, football club established by the Turkish community 
 Islam in Australia
 Kemal Atatürk Memorial, Canberra

References

Notes

Bibliography 

.
 
.
.

.
 
 
.
 
.
.
 

.
.
 
.
 
.

External links 

Australian Turkish Association
Australian Turkish Cypriot Cultural and Welfare Association

Immigration to Australia
Ethnic groups in Australia
 
Australia